Abdolbaghi Darvish  (26 April 1948 – 20 February 1986) was an Iranian Air Force pilot who served during the Iran–Iraq War.

Early life
He was born in 1948 in Nowshahr. After finishing school, he had accepted in Iran's air force college and after that for advance training he was sent to the United States in 1969.

End of life
On 20 February 1986, Darvish was shot down by an Iraqi MiG-23ML while flying his Iranian F27-600. All 51 crew and passengers were killed. The aircraft was carrying a delegation of military and government officials on a mission. He was posthumously promoted to the rank of Major General.

See also
 Iran–Iraq War

References

 1948 births
 1986 deaths
Iranian military personnel killed in the Iran–Iraq War
Islamic Republic of Iran Army colonels
Mazandarani people
Burials at Behesht-e Zahra
Aviators killed by being shot down
Islamic Republic of Iran Air Force personnel
People from Nowshahr